BC Telšiai is a professional Telšiai, Lithuania basketball club, currently playing in National Basketball League.

History

Players

Team roster

Club achievements 
 2012-2013 season: RKL 4th place
 2013-2014 season: RKL 3rd place
 2014-2015 season: RKL Winners
 2015-2016 season: NKL Round of 16
 2016-2017 season: NKL Round of 8
 2017-2018 season: NKL Round of 16
 2018-2019 season: NKL 3rd place

External links 
 BC Telšiai website

Telsiai
Telšiai
Basketball teams established in 2012
2012 establishments in Lithuania
National Basketball League (Lithuania) teams